Westfield Penrith, formerly Penrith Plaza, is a shopping centre in the suburb of Penrith in the Greater Western Sydney area of New South Wales, Australia.

The shopping centre opened on 31 March 1971 with Myer as lead tenant and was sold to the General Property Trust (GPT) in April 1971.

In early 2005, GPT reached agreement with the Westfield Group to sell 50% of Penrith Plaza after which it became known as Westfield Penrith.

Expansions

In November and December 2022, Westfield Penrith debuted a $33 million update including a Coles supermarket and a Holey Moley indoor golf course.

References

External links 
Westfield Penrith Official Website

Westfield Group
Shopping malls established in 1971
Shopping centres in Sydney
1971 establishments in Australia